St George River may refer to:

Australia
 St George River (Queensland), a watercourse in Queensland
 St George River (Victoria), a watercourse in Victoria

United States
 Saint George River, a watercourse in the U.S. state of Maine

See also
 Saint-Georges River (rivière au Chêne tributary), Quebec, Canada